The Two Roads Theater is a 60-seat black box theatre, with an elevated stage, located in Studio City, California at 4348 Tujunga Ave in the Little Tujunga Village neighborhood. Originally built in 1986, and housed in a building constructed in 1946, the intimate theater was remodeled and refurbished in 2003 shortly after it was purchased by Rick and Shari Shaw from Edmund Gaynes, currently operator of the St Luke's Theater in New York City. The Two Roads Theater is a member of the NoHo Arts District, in North Hollywood, the Valley Theater League and the Tujunga Village Merchants’ Association.

The Two Roads was named “LA's Most Charming Small Theatre” by the Studio City Sun in 2008 and is home to original stage comedies and musicals, live comedy, improv and music shows, film screenings, seminars, acting classes, workshops and the Valley Film Festival.  Located within the Two Roads Theater is the Two Roads Gallery - a hybrid gallery of contemporary art.

In June 2011, The Two Roads presented the world premiere of "Kowalski", a new play by Gregg Ostrin.

Notable Productions
Notable past productions include:

2023 - The How and the Why by Sarah Treem, starring Samantha Gregory

2008-2010 - It’s Just Sex 

2009, 2010 - The Vagina Monologues; The Angry Man In The Pink Hat; I Love You, You’re Perfect, Now Change; Savages; Spike Heels; Mr. Marmalade; It Could Have Been A Wonderful Life

2009 - The Shape of Things

2008 - Fighting For The Title, Freak, Dupe, Savage in Limbo,  Sex, Drugs and Minivans 

2007, 2008, 2009 -  The Resurrection of Harriet Tubman and Rosa Parks for Literacy Tour 

2007 - Lucy & the Wolf,  Doubting Thomason; Here's The Thing May 11 - 12, 2007

2006 - The Portrait Of A Life... A Story About A Guy; Loveswell Oct 21 - Nov 27

2005 - Drama Kings, Weeping for J.F.K.; Diary of a Madman

External links

NoHo Arts District
LA Weekly
Room to Improv
Theater Mania
Yellow Bot

Theatres in Los Angeles
Theatres completed in 1986
1986 establishments in California
Studio City, Los Angeles